The Central American and Caribbean Championships in Athletics is an athletics event which began in 1967. Records set by athletes who are representing one of the Central American and Caribbean Athletic Confederation's member states.

Men's records

Women's records

Records in defunct events

Men's events

Women's events

A = affected by altitude

References

External links

Central American and Caribbean Championships
Records